Elías David Díaz Soto (born November 17, 1990) is a Venezuelan professional baseball catcher for the Colorado Rockies of Major League Baseball (MLB). He previously played for the Pittsburgh Pirates.

Career

Pittsburgh Pirates

Díaz signed with the Pittsburgh Pirates as an international free agent in 2008. He made his professional debut in 2009 for the Venezuelan Summer League Pirates. From 2010 to 2013, he played for the Gulf Coast Pirates (batting .210), West Virginia Power (batting .221, and then .208 the following year) and Bradenton Marauders (batting .279).

Díaz started 2014 with the Double-A Altoona Curve. In August he was promoted to the Triple-A Indianapolis Indians after hitting .328 with Altoona, but he then batted .152/.243/.182 in AAA. On November 20, 2014, Díaz was placed on the Pirates' 40-man roster.

Diaz batted 0–2 in the major leagues in 2015, 0–4 in 2016, and .223/.265/.314 with one home run in 200 plate appearances in 2017.

On December 2, 2019, Díaz was non-tendered by Pittsburgh and became a free agent.

Colorado Rockies
On January 6, 2020, Díaz signed a minor league deal with the Colorado Rockies. Díaz made the Opening Day roster for the Rockies and was selected to the 40-man roster on July 22, 2020. Díaz batted .235/.288/.353 with 2 home runs in 73 plate appearances over 2020. In 2021 he batted .246/.310/.464 with 18 home runs and 44 RBI in 106 games. On November 18, 2021, Díaz signed a three-year, $14.5 million extension with the Rockies. On September 10, Diaz went 4-for-5 with two home runs and seven RBIs, including a three-run walk-off home run, leading the Rockies to a 13-10 win.

See also
 List of Major League Baseball players from Venezuela

References

External links

1990 births
Living people
Altoona Curve players
Bradenton Marauders players
Bravos de Margarita players
Colorado Rockies players
Gulf Coast Pirates players
Indianapolis Indians players
Major League Baseball catchers
Major League Baseball players from Venezuela
Pittsburgh Pirates players
Scottsdale Scorpions players
Venezuelan expatriate baseball players in the United States
Venezuelan Summer League Pirates players
West Virginia Power players
Sportspeople from Maracaibo
2023 World Baseball Classic players